The 2004 Exeter City Council election took place on 10 June 2004, to elect members of Exeter City Council in Devon, England. The election was held concurrently with other local elections in England. One third of the council was up for election and the council remained under no overall control.

Results summary

Ward results

Alphington

Exwick

Newtown

Pennsylvania

Pinhoe

Polsloe

Priory

St Davids

St James

St Leonards

St Loyes

St Thomas

Topsham

Whipton & Barton

By-elections

St. James

References

2004 English local elections
2004
2000s in Exeter